|}

The Betfair Exchange Trophy Handicap Hurdle, is a Grade 3 National Hunt hurdle race in Great Britain which is open to horses aged four years or older. It is run at Ascot over a distance of about 1 mile and 7½ furlongs (1 mile 7 furlongs and 152 yards, or 3,156 metres). It is a handicap race, and it is scheduled to take place each year in December.

The race was first run in Great Britain in 2001 having been staged as The Ladbroke Handicap Hurdle in January at Leopardstown in Ireland prior to that. The Irish race continued under different sponsored titles and is now run as the Liffey Handicap Hurdle. The Ascot race was awarded Grade 3 status in 2013. It continued to be run as the Ladbroke Handicap Hurdle until 2015, and the 2016 running was titled the Wessex Youth Trust Handicap Hurdle. In 2017 the race title promoted the Racing Welfare charity, and since 2018 the race has been sponsored by Betfair.

Winners

See also 
 Horse racing in Great Britain
 List of British National Hunt races

References

Racing Post:

Ascot Racecourse
National Hunt hurdle races
National Hunt races in Great Britain